In computing, a character set is a system of assigning numbers to characters so that text can be represented as a list of numbers (which are then stored, for example, as a file). For example, ASCII assigns 61 to "A". As part of the design process, Texas Instruments (TI) decided to modify the base Latin-1 character set for use with its calculator interface. By adding symbols to the character set, it was possible to reduce design complexity as much more complex parsing would have to have been used otherwise.

TI-83 Plus/84 Plus Series

TI-86

TI-89/92 Series 

The 68k calculators use a character set similar to Latin-1 except that most of the control characters are replaced with mathematical symbols or Greek letters.  All characters are printable except the null character.

See also 
Calculator character sets

References 

Calculator character sets